Ceratapion onopordi is a species of beetle belonging to the family Brentidae.

It is native to Eurasia.

References

Brentidae
Beetles described in 1808